Wequetequock Cove is a cove located in southeastern Connecticut, near Stonington. It empties into Fishers Island Sound. Elihu Island and Goat Island (Connecticut) are in Wequetequock Cove. Saltwater Farm Vineyard is located along its shore. Fishers Island, New York is a boundary between the Cove and the Atlantic Ocean.

References

Coves of the United States
Bodies of water of New London County, Connecticut
Bays of Connecticut